William Donnelly (1872 – 1934) was an Irish footballer who played as a goalkeeper for Vale of Clyde, Hibernian, Clyde, Celtic, Belfast Celtic and Liverpool during the 1890s and early 1900s.

Born in Magherafelt and raised in Scotland, he played for a number of Scottish teams and gained a reputation as an expert in stopping penalties before signing for Liverpool from Clyde in May 1896. He was the club's second-choice goalkeeper behind Harry Storer during the 1896–97 Football League season and had a run in the side after Storer was injured, becoming the second Irishman to play for Liverpool. 

Returning to Clyde in 1898, Donnelly had joined Celtic by the 1900–01 Scottish Football League season and was a back-up option again, this time to Dan McArthur. He left Scotland for Belfast Celtic in mid-1901.

Notes

References

1872 births
Irish association footballers (before 1923)
Liverpool F.C. players
1934 deaths
Vale of Clyde F.C. players
Hibernian F.C. players
Clyde F.C. players
Celtic F.C. players
Belfast Celtic F.C. players
People from Magherafelt
Association football goalkeepers
Footballers from Glasgow
Sportspeople from County Londonderry
Scottish Football League players
English Football League players
NIFL Premiership players
Scottish Junior Football Association players